"Real Real Real" is a song from the UK band Jesus Jones' 1991 album Doubt. It was released in 1990 as the first single from Doubt, just prior to the release of the album. It was succeeded by the Billboard Top 10 hit "Right Here, Right Now" (which, in the UK peaked at No. 31). "Real Real Real" did better, reaching a peak of No. 19 on the UK Singles Chart. It was also their second Top 10 US hit after "Right Here, Right Now," peaking at No. 4 on the Billboard Hot 100. The song is featured on the Happy Daze compilation.

Charts

Weekly charts

Year-end charts

References

1990 songs
1990 singles
1991 singles
Jesus Jones songs